"Nålens öga" (Swedish for The Needle's Eye) is a single by the band Kent, released on 21 June 2006. The CD comes in a sleeve and has just the one song. This single was specially written and recorded by Kent for Swedish Save the Children. It was used as signature music for a TV-documentary called "Det handlar om ett barn". The documentary was a co-production between TV4 and Swedish Save the Children to educate about children being victims of domestic violence. All revenue from the single also went directly to Swedish Save the Children.

Charts

References

2006 singles
Kent (band) songs
Songs written by Joakim Berg